Addingham railway station was on the Midland Railway route from Skipton to Ilkley. It served the village of Addingham in West Yorkshire, England.

History 

Opened by the Midland Railway, it became part of the London, Midland and Scottish Railway during the Grouping of 1923. Passing on to the Eastern Region of British Railways on nationalisation in 1948, it was then closed by the British Railways Board as part of the Beeching Axe in March 1965. It was demolished several years later and the site is now a housing estate. The bridge and abutments have also been demolished, but an embankment remains.

Preservation 
There are plans to extend the Embsay and Bolton Abbey Steam Railway back to Addingham to a replica LMS-style station on the embankment, near the original station site, on a rebuilt bridge abutment.

The picture showing Addingham Station Fisheries is where the railway bridge crossed Addingham Main Street. The actual Addingham station was about  further up the road, on the left-hand side. Although houses have now been built over the site of the station, the original goods yard is still used as an entrance drive to the houses built there and some of the old boundary walls still exist from the Victoria Terrace side.

References 

 
 
 
 Station on navigable O.S. map

External links 
Bolton Abbey to Addingham on the Embsay website
Addingham Station on the Embsay website
Sustrans plan involving the trackbed

Disused railway stations in Bradford
Former Midland Railway stations
Beeching closures in England
Railway stations in Great Britain opened in 1888
Railway stations in Great Britain closed in 1965